Team dressage equestrian at the 2014 Asian Games was held in Dream Park Equestrian Venue, Incheon, South Korea on September 20, 2014.

Schedule
All times are Korea Standard Time (UTC+09:00)

Results

References

Results

External links
Official website

Team dressage